Archimedean Upper Conservatory is a public charter high school in Miami, Florida. Archimedean Upper Conservatory (AUC) is a member of Archimedean Schools. The Archimedean Schools are an independently managed, feeder-patterned K through 12 public- charter school system founded in 2002 by Archimedean Academy Inc., a non-profit 501(c) (3) organization, sponsored by Miami-Dade County Public Schools. The Archimedean Schools consist of three conservatories focused on mathematics and the Greek language: Archimedean Academy (grades K-5),  Archimedean Middle Conservatory (grades 6-8), both nationally recognized as Blue Ribbon schools 2011, and the 2012 AdvancED SACS-CASI Accredited Archimedean Upper Conservatory. 
The Archimedean Schools are Conservatories of Mathematics and the Greek Language. Their enhanced curriculum focuses in depth in: advanced mathematics in English and in Greek, advanced science (7-12) “Physics First” program,  and Philosophy for Children (6-12) with selected themes and concepts in ethics, metaphysics and logic. Serving more than 1,140 multicultural, multilingual students, the Archimedean Schools have consistently ranked among the top-performing public and private schools in the county, the State of Florida and the nation. The mission statement of the schools are to initiate the young mind into the art of thinking through the teaching of Mathematics and the Greek Language.

Archimedean Upper Conservatory is a  Miami- Dade county public charter school funded by the State of Florida. It was established in 2008. Its students are chosen by lottery and pay no tuition. 50% of its students receive free or reduced lunch, 70% minority, and 75% are of Hispanic origin. 

It offers its students a dual language curriculum:
• The American Curriculum with core subjects in Language Arts, Mathematics, Social Studies & Science taught in English based on the Next Generation Sunshine Standards (NGSSS). AUC's science curriculum is a “Physics First” program.
• The Greek curriculum in Mathematics and Greek Language  is utilized as a "linguistic vehicle" in order to bring the students a European type of Mathematical curriculum as an enhancement to the standard American curriculum.
The Greek Language is used to guide the students’ minds through the ideas of Algebra, Geometry, Discrete Mathematics, Logic, and Physics as a complement to the standard Elementary Algebra/ Analysis/Calculus themes of the American curriculum as well as themes of Greek civilization and literature.

For 2013-2014 some of the recognitions are as follows:
 Rank #16 in the nation for Most Challenging High Schools,(The Washington Post, April,  2015, https://apps.washingtonpost.com/local/highschoolchallenge/schools/2015/list/national/).
 Rank #19 in the nation for Most Challenging High Schools,(The Washington Post, April,  2014, mostchallenginghighschools2014).
 Rank #100 in the nation for Best High Schools,( US. News Best High Schools 2014, data based on 2011-2012 school year),  (2014 was the first year of eligibility for this ranking . Data based on graduating  class of  2012).
 Rank #12# in Florida, ( US. News Best High Schools 2014), besthighschools2014 (First year of eligibility for this ranking. Data based on graduating  class of  2012).
 Rank  24# National Charter High Schools, ( US. News Best High Schools 2014), besthighschools2014 (First year of eligibility for this ranking. Data based on graduating  class of  2012).

References

High schools in Miami-Dade County, Florida
Public high schools in Florida
Charter schools in Florida